Valentin Mikhailovich Arbakov (28 January 1952 – 30 November 2003) was a Russian chess Grandmaster. In 1981, he shared first place in that year's Moscow City Chess Championship together with Andrei Sokolov. He was known for his skills in blitz chess.

References

External links
Valentin Arbakov chess games at 365Chess.com

1952 births
2003 deaths
Chess grandmasters
Soviet chess players
Russian chess players
20th-century chess players